Thomas Drummond (1833 – April 1865) was an American politician.

Drummond was a native of Virginia, born in 1833. Aged 22, he moved to Vinton, Iowa, and became the editor of the Vinton Eagle. The following year, Drummond was a delegate at the Republican National Convention. In 1857, Drummond was elected to the Iowa House of Representatives from District 10, which included Benton County at the time. In 1860, Drummond won election to the Iowa Senate as a representative of District 35. When the American Civil War broke out, he organized a volunteer corps and was commissioned as a lieutenant-colonel of the Fourth Iowa Cavalry. Months later, Drummond was assigned a commission with the Fifth United States Cavalry. He died of injuries sustained during the Battle of Five Forks.

References

Editors of Iowa newspapers
19th-century American newspaper editors
United States politicians killed during the Civil War
1833 births
1865 deaths
19th-century American politicians
People of Iowa in the American Civil War
Military personnel from Iowa
People from Vinton, Iowa
Republican Party Iowa state senators
Republican Party members of the Iowa House of Representatives